Mineola High School is a public high school in the Mineola Union Free School District and is located in Garden City Park, New York. It serves Mineola, as well as certain parts of Albertson, Williston Park, Garden City Park, and Roslyn Heights.

History 
The current high school opened in 1962, replacing the old high school, built in 1927, which now houses the Mineola Middle School. In 2016, the high school underwent a multimillion-dollar renovation, which included the refurbishment of the school's library. Since 1981, it has been fully accredited by the Middle States Evaluation Committee.

Mineola's mascot is the Mustang, which replaced the original “Maroon” mascot in the early 1960s.

Fine arts
The Mineola Union Free School District was recognized as being one of the best communities for music education in the United States from 2009 to 2022. In the winter months the Mineola Colorguard produces two indoor performance ensembles. Mineola White is composed of first-year members and competes in the Scholastic Novice Class in local competition. Mineola Red, an all-veteran ensemble, competes nationally in Winter Guard International (WGI). In 2006 Mineola High School became the first Scholastic colorguard program on Long Island to attend the prestigious WGI World Championships. In February 2009 Mineola Red was crowned the WGI Northeast Regional Scholastic A Champions at Trumbull, Connecticut, and in April 2009 finished 21st out of 102 units at the WGI World Championships in Dayton, Ohio.

In 2010, Mineola Red was once again crowned the WGI Northeast Regional Scholastic A Champions at Trumbull. Then in April at Dayton, Ohio placed 16 out of more than 100 guards in Championships.

The Mineola Mustang Marching Band and Colorguard compete in the fall in the New York State Field Band Conference (NYSFBC) and were named the 2009, 2018 and 2019 New York State Small School Class 2 state champions making Mineola High School only the 4th school and 5th band to win back to back Small School Class 2 championships. In 2021, after moving up to New York State Small School Class 1, they finished in 3rd place.  In 2022, The Mustang Marching Band won the Small School Class 1 Championship.

Athletics

The Mineola boys spring Track and Field team won Nassau County Championships in 2010. The Mineola boys' varsity soccer team won the Nassau & Long Island Championship in 2005 and won Conference ABC 1 in 2006.  The girls' softball team has won Nassau County, Long Island, and state championships in its history. Its football team is among the top 50 in New York State for longest winning streaks, going 28–0–2 over several years.

Demographics 
As of the 2014–2015 school year, the school had an enrollment of 972 students and 80.6 classroom teachers (on an FTE basis), for a student–teacher ratio of 12.1:1. There were 185 students (19.0% of enrollment) eligible for free lunch and 49 (5.0% of students) eligible for reduced-cost lunch.

Notable alumni

Steven Boghos Derounian (Class of 1934), United States Congressman
Carolyn McCarthy (Class of 1962), United States Congresswoman
Jack Emmer (Class of 1963), Hall of Fame Army lacrosse coach
Stephen Schwartz (Class of 1964), composer.
Manny Matos (Class of 1971), professional soccer player
Thomas DiNapoli (Class of 1972), New York State Comptroller
Richie Meade (Class of 1974), Navy lacrosse coach
Haywood Nelson (Class of 1978), actor from What's Happening!!
 Amit M. Shelat (Class of 1993), Vice Chairman of the New York State Board for Medicine, New York State Education Department
 Karla Cavalli (Class of 1994), Miss New York USA 2002, Emmy nominated actress, host, writer and producer, Host of Travel Channel's Planet Primetime 
Lauren Scala (Class of 2000), WNBC and New York Nonstop correspondent

References

External links 
 http://www.newyorksportswriters.org/index.shtml
 Web site For Mineola High School
 LongIsland High School Soccer Information
 The Mineola Girls Varsity Basketball Team vs Garden City 1-08-07
 Boys Varsity Soccer Playoffs - Mineola vs Wantagh 11-01-06

Mineola, New York
Public high schools in New York (state)
Schools in Nassau County, New York
1927 establishments in New York (state)